This is a listing of past and present correctional facilities run by the provincial government in Ontario, Canada. Provincial correctional facilities for adults are operated by the province's Ministry of the Solicitor General. Youth facilities have at various times been under the same jurisdiction, but currently fall under the Ministry of Children, Community and Social Services.

Types of facilities
Adult correctional facilities in Ontario are divided into four categories: correctional centres, jails, detention centres, and treatment centres. Some facilities are more than one type. Correctional centres house sentenced offenders who are serving a period of incarceration of up to two years, less a day. Provincial jails (historically spelled gaols) and detention centres house persons awaiting trial, offenders serving short sentences, or offenders awaiting transfer to other facilities. Jails are smaller and older facilities originally established by local governments while detention centres are larger, regional facilities.  Treatment centres are specialized facilities treating offenders for sexual misconduct, substance abuse, anger management, and other issues.

Youth correctional facilities in Ontario are also called "secure custody facilities" and hold young people who were between 12 to 17 years of age at the time of offence. Youths are held in secure custody facilities if they are sentenced to secure custody after being found guilty of a crime or if a youth is ordered to be held in custody before or during a trial. , the Ministry of Children, Community and Social Services directly operates six secure custody facilities.

Operational correctional facilities

Adult

Youth

Past jails and correctional facilities

See also 
 :Category:Correctional Service of Canada institutions

Notes

References 

 Correctional Services - Ontario Ministry of the Solicitor General
 Ontario Archives

 
Canada, Ontario
Correctional facilities